FK Radnički Šid is a football club based in Šid, Vojvodina, Serbia. They currently compete in the Vojvodina League South, the fourth tier of the national league system.

History
In June 2010, Radnički merged with 2009–10 Serbian League Vojvodina champions Big Bull Bačinci to compete under the name Big Bull Radnički in the 2010–11 Serbian First League. They finished second from the bottom in their debut season in the second tier, thus suffering relegation back to the Serbian League Vojvodina. Afterwards, the club continued competing under the name Radnički in the 2011–12 Serbian League Vojvodina.

Seasons

Notable players
For a list of all FK Radnički Šid players with a Wikipedia article, see :Category:FK Radnički Šid players.

References

External links
 Club page at Srbijasport
 Club page at Srbijafudbal

1910 establishments in Serbia
Association football clubs established in 1910
Football clubs in Vojvodina
Football clubs in Serbia